Stefaan Maene (born 13 May 1972 in Ostend) is a former backstroke, freestyle and medley swimmer from Belgium, who competed for his native country at the 1992 Summer Olympics in Barcelona, Spain. He won his first international medal at the inaugural 1993 FINA Short Course World Championships in Palma de Mallorca: bronze in the 200 m backstroke. Two years later, at the 1995 European Aquatics Championships in Vienna, Austria, Maene gained bronze in the 100 m backstroke.

References

1972 births
Living people
Belgian male freestyle swimmers
Belgian male medley swimmers
Belgian male backstroke swimmers
Olympic swimmers of Belgium
Swimmers at the 1992 Summer Olympics
Sportspeople from Ostend
Medalists at the FINA World Swimming Championships (25 m)
European Aquatics Championships medalists in swimming